Blanche Fisher Wright Laite (1887  – 1971) was an American children's book illustrator active in the 1910s. She is best known for illustrating The Real Mother Goose, published in 1916 by Rand McNally.

She married actor  and in 1925 they fostered Gordon Laite who became a children's book illustrator in the 1960s and 1970s.

References

External links

 
 
171 scanned images from The Real Mother Goose

1887 births
1971 deaths
American children's book illustrators
American women illustrators